Tom Niehaus is an American former politician who served as President of the Ohio Senate from 2011 to 2012. He also was the state senator for the 14th District from 2005 to 2012. He served in the Ohio House of Representatives from 2001 to 2004. He currently works as a principal with Vorys Advisors LLC, a wholly owned affiliate of the law firm, Vorys, Sater, Seymour and Pease.  In this role, Niehaus provides business and strategic counsel to the law firm’s clients and other businesses and organizations. Niehaus works in the firm’s Cincinnati office and also maintains an office in Columbus.

Career
A graduate of Xavier University and Ohio State University, Niehaus spent ten years with Harte Hanks Communications, and 15 years (ten as an editor/publisher) with Community Press, a network of 27 community newspapers serving the Greater Cincinnati area.

With incumbent Representative Rose Vesper term limited and unable to run for another term, Niehaus sought to replace her. In the 2000 election, Niehaus defeated Melvin Dean and Scott Boone to win the Republican nomination with 46% of the vote. He won the general election against Democrat Ken Zuk by 10,000 votes. Niehaus was unopposed for reelection in 2002.

Ohio Senate
Midway through 2003, Niehaus and Jean Schmidt stated their intentions to run to succeed Senate President Doug White in 2004. Niehaus was supported by Senator White and former Representative Rose Vesper, while Schmidt received support from Speaker of the House Larry Householder. The primary proved to be one of the closest watched of the cycle. The campaign prompted complaints over fund-raising tactics and featured testy television spots centered on disputes over tax votes. The Ohio Taxpayers Association launched a $100,000 TV "issue ad" campaign that labeled Mr. Niehaus a tax-hiker.

Schmidt initially beat Niehaus by 62 votes. However, with a mandatory recount enacted and the counting of provisional ballots beginning, Niehaus began to close the gap, and by late March, Niehaus had taken the lead.  Niehaus was certified the winner by 22 votes. Niehaus went on to defeat Democrat Paul Schwietering by 53,000 votes.

In his first term in the Senate, Niehaus served as Chairman of the Senate Environment & Natural Resources Committee. In 2008, when Randy Gardner resigned from the Senate, Niehaus was chosen by Senate colleagues to take his place as Senate majority floor leader, and after Jeff Jacobson's resignation, Niehaus again was elevated to Senate President pro tempore.

Niehaus won reelection in 2008 against Democrat Gregory Napolitano by 50,000 votes. He again was selected to serve as President pro tempore for the 128th General Assembly.

Niehaus served again as President of the Senate for the 129th General Assembly. On opening day of that assembly, Niehaus set a tone for bipartisanship, stating "I want to assure the Senate that this will be a deliberative body where all voices will be heard." As President of the Senate, Niehaus also served as chairman of the Rules and Reference Committee.

References

External links
The Ohio Senate - Senator Thomas E. Niehaus (R) - District 14
Project Vote Smart - Senator Tom Niehaus (OH) profile
Follow the Money - Tom Niehaus
2006 2004 2002 

Republican Party members of the Ohio House of Representatives
Politicians from Cincinnati
Living people
21st-century American politicians
Presidents of the Ohio State Senate
Republican Party Ohio state senators
People from New Richmond, Ohio
Year of birth missing (living people)